Mathilde (born Jonkvrouw Mathilde Marie Christine Ghislaine  d'Udekem d'Acoz ; 20 January 1973) is Queen of the Belgians as the wife of King Philippe. She is the first native-born Belgian queen. She has founded and assisted  charities to decrease poverty in the country.

Early life and family

Mathilde Marie Christine Ghislaine d'Udekem d'Acoz was born on 20 January 1973 at Edith Cavell Hospital in Uccle, Belgium.  Her parents are Count and Countess Patrick d'Udekem d'Acoz. Mathilde has three sisters: Marie-Alix, Elisabeth and Hélène, and one brother Charles-Henri.

Upon Mathilde's marriage to Prince Philippe of Belgium, the Duke of Brabant in 1999, King Albert II of Belgium elevated the  d'Udekem d'Acoz family from the baronial to the comital rank, hereditary in the male lineage. Upon the accession of her husband, Prince Philippe, Duke of Brabant to the throne of Belgium she became the first queen consort of native Belgian nationality.

Education and career
Mathilde attended primary school in Bastogne and then attended secondary school at the Institut de la Vierge Fidèle in Brussels where she studied modern languages. From 1991 until 1994, Mathilde attended the Institut Libre Marie Haps in Brussels, where she studied speech therapy and graduated magna cum laude. She worked as a speech therapist in her own practice in Brussels from 1995 to 1999. She also worked part-time at a primary school. She also studied psychology at the Université catholique de Louvain and earned a master's degree in psychology in 2002 with honours (cum laude).

Mathilde speaks French, Dutch, English and Italian. She is also able to speak basic Spanish. Her mother, who has lived most of her life outside Poland, did not teach her Polish, thinking that it would not be necessary. Therefore, she knows only a few words of Polish.

Marriage and children

The announcement of Mathilde's engagement to the Belgian heir-apparent Prince Philippe came as a surprise to the country. Mathilde married Philippe on 4 December 1999 in Brussels, civilly at the Brussels Town Hall and religiously at the Cathedral of St. Michael and St. Gudula. Mathilde's bridal gown was designed by Édouard Vermeulen. She was made Duchess of Brabant and a Princess of Belgium on 8 November 1999 (published on 13 November 1999 and effective from 4 December 1999).

The couple have four children:
Princess Elisabeth, Duchess of Brabant, born 25 October 2001 at Erasmus Hospital in Brussels
Prince Gabriel, born 20 August 2003 at Erasmus Hospital in Brussels
Prince Emmanuel, born 4 October 2005 at Erasmus Hospital in Brussels
Princess Eléonore, born 16 April 2008 at Erasmus Hospital in Brussels

Princess Elisabeth, the couple's eldest child, is the first in line to the throne and ahead of her younger brothers and sister, who are second, third, and fourth in line to succeed, owing to a change in Belgian succession laws in 1991, allowing for the eldest child to succeed, regardless of sex.

Activities
Queen Mathilde is concerned with a range of social issues including education, child poverty, intergenerational poverty, the position of women in society and literacy.

Since 2009, Queen Mathilde has been the honorary president of Unicef Belgium. She serves as the World Health Organization's Special Representative for Immunization. She also the honorary president of the Breast International Group, a non-profit organisation for academic breast cancer research groups from around the world.

She set up the Princess Mathilde Fund (now the Queen Mathilde Fund) in 2001, which promotes the care of vulnerable people and awards an annual prize for good works in a particular sector. The sector changes each year: examples include early years education, women's health, and protecting young people from violence.

Queen Mathilde deploys the Queen's Charities to offer help to citizens who are struggling to cope with financial hardship in their daily lives and often turn to her as a last resort. The Queen is the honorary president of Child Focus, a foundation for missing and sexually exploited children.

Queen Mathilde is also a patron of the Queen Elisabeth Music Competition, an international competition founded in 1937 as an initiative of Queen Elisabeth and Belgian composer and violist Eugène Ysaÿe.

In 2018, Queen Mathilde became the honorary president of the Federal Council for Sustainable Development. According to the royal tradition, Queen Mathilde became an honorary member of the Royal Academy of Medicine of Belgium.

Queen Mathilde is a member of the Schwab Foundation Board for Social Entrepreneurship. She was a United Nations Emissary for the International Year of Microcredit 2005, which focused in particular on financial inclusion and financial literacy. The Queen also attends the annual World Economic Forum in Davos.

Queen Mathilde was named a United Nations Sustainable Development Goal Advocate in 2016, promoting the 17 Sustainable Development Goals (an agenda for global sustainable development). 

The Queen also presided at the ceremony awarding the King Baudouin International Development Prize.

The Queen will receive an Honorary Doctorate from the Hasselt University on May 30, 2023.

Honours

National 
: Grand Cordon of the Order of Leopold

Foreign
: Knight of the Order of the Elephant, 2017.
: Grand Cross of the Order of the Legion of Honour, 2018
: Grand Cross of the Order of the White Rose of Finland
: Grand Cross Special Class of the Order of Merit of the Federal Republic of Germany
: Grand Cross of the Order of the Redeemer 2 May 2022
: 
 Dame Grand Cross of the Order of the Holy Sepulchre
 Dame of the Collar of the Order of the Holy Sepulchre 17 November 2015
: Grand Cordon (Paulownia) of the Order of the Precious Crown
: Grand Cordon of the Supreme Order of the Renaissance
: Grand Cross of the Order of Vytautas the Great 24 October 2022
: 
 Knight of the Order of the Gold Lion of the House of Nassau, 2019
 Grand Cross of the Order of Adolphe of Nassau
:
 Knight Grand Cross of the Order of the Netherlands Lion, 2016.
 Knight Grand Cross of the Order of Orange-Nassau
 Recipient of the King Willem-Alexander Inauguration Medal
: Grand Cross of the Order of Saint Olav
:
 Grand Cross of the Order of the White Eagle
 Grand Cross of the Order of Merit of the Republic of Poland
: 
 Grand Cross of the Order of Christ, 2006.
 Grand Collar of the Order of Prince Henry, 2018.
: Dame Grand Cross of the Order of Isabella the Catholic 12 May 2000
: 
 Commander Grand Cross of the Royal Order of the Polar Star
 Recipient of the 70th Birthday Badge Medal of King Carl XVI Gustaf

Arms

References

External links

Official biography from the Belgian Royal Family website

1973 births
Living people
Belgian princesses
Belgian queens consort
Duchesses of Brabant
House of Saxe-Coburg and Gotha (Belgium)
House of Belgium
Princesses of Saxe-Coburg and Gotha
Belgian people of Polish descent
Belgian nobility
Belgian Roman Catholics
Polish Roman Catholics
Sapieha
Speech and language pathologists
People from Uccle
Université catholique de Louvain alumni

Commanders Grand Cross of the Order of the Polar Star
Dames Grand Cross of the Order of Isabella the Catholic
Grand Crosses of the Order of Merit of the Republic of Poland
Grand Crosses of the Order of Christ (Portugal)
Knights Grand Cross of the Order of Orange-Nassau
Members of the Order of the Holy Sepulchre
Grand Crosses Special Class of the Order of Merit of the Federal Republic of Germany
Grand Cordons of the Order of the Precious Crown
Grand Croix of the Légion d'honneur
Komorowski family
Princesses by marriage